Jamaica competed at the 12th Pan American Games, which were held in Mar del Plata, Argentina from March 11 to March 26, 1995.

Medals

Silver

Women's 200 metres: Dahlia Duhaney
Men's 4x400 metres: Orville Taylor, Dennis Blake, Roxbert Martin, and Michael McDonald

Bronze

Men's Doubles:
Mixed Doubles:

Results by event

See also
Jamaica at the 1994 Commonwealth Games
Jamaica at the 1996 Summer Olympics

Nations at the 1995 Pan American Games
P
1995